Sonny Charles (born Charles Hemphill, September 4, 1940) is an American soul singer born to a sharecropping family at Blytheville, Arkansas. At the age of 10. he moved with his parents and six sisters to Fort Wayne, Indiana. He was the lead singer of the Checkmates, Ltd. in the 1960s and 1970s, and it is his vocals that are heard out front on their 1969 Phil Spector-produced hit, "Black Pearl". Charles launched a solo career in the early 1970s, and had a brief reunion with the Checkmates during the 1980s. Thereafter, from the mid- to late 1990s, he toured with another member of the Checkmates, Ltd., Marvin "Sweet Louie" Smith, under the Checkmates name.

Albums and musical career  
Charles's 1982 album, The Sun Still Shines, recorded on Highrise Records, hit #136 on the Billboard album chart and #14 on U.S. Black Albums on the strength of the single "Put It in a Magazine". Written by Charles with producer Bobby Paris, the song went to #2 on the R&B Singles chart and reached #40 on the Billboard Hot 100 in early 1983. The follow-up single, "Always on My Mind", peaked at #53, but Charles quickly fell from view.

Steve Miller Band

Charles joined the Steve Miller Band in 2008, toured with them, and left in 2012.

References

1940 births
Living people
Musicians from Fort Wayne, Indiana
American male singers
American soul musicians
American rhythm and blues singers
Steve Miller Band members

External links

Sonny Charles talks about his period with Phil Spector and solo recordings